Out to Every Nation is the third album by Jørn Lande's solo project Jorn, released on 26 October 2004. The album features HammerFall bassist Magnus Rosén and Pagan's Mind guitarist Jørn Viggo Lofstad, drummer Stian Kristoffersen and keyboardist Ronny Tegner.

Track listing
All songs written by Jørn Lande and Jørn Viggo Lofstad.

 "Young Forever" - 4:54
 "Out to Every Nation" - 4:23
 "Something Real" - 5:40
 "Living with Wolves" - 3:53
 "Vision Eyes" - 4:11
 "One Day We Will Put Out the Sun" - 6:25
 "Behind the Clown" - 4:15
 "Rock Spirit" - 4:36
 "Through Day and Night" - 4:43
 "When Angel Wings Were White" - 7:03
 "Big" (Japanese & Russian edition bonus track)

Bonus Tracks on Limited Edition
 "Young Forever" (Radio Edit) - 4:55
 "Out to Every Nation" (Radio Edit) - 4:24
 "Living with Wolves" (Radio Edit) - 3:58

Personnel
Jørn Lande - lead vocals
Jørn Viggo Lofstad - guitar
Magnus Rosén - bass
Stian Kristoffersen - drums
Ronny Tegner - keyboards

Release history

References

2004 albums
Jørn Lande albums
AFM Records albums